Pussewela Liyanage Bauddhasara (born 1 June 1915) was a Ceylonese politician.

In 1947 Bauddhasara was elected to the Parliament of Ceylon at the 1st parliamentary election, in the Polonnaruwa electorate, representing the United National Party. He secured 1,604 votes (45% of the total vote), defeating five other candidates to win the seat.

References

1915 births
United National Party politicians
Members of the 1st Parliament of Ceylon
Date of death missing